Juraj Bezúch (born 20 December 1993) is a Slovak professional ice hockey player who currently playing for HC Nové Zámky of the Slovak Extraliga.

Career statistics

Regular season and playoffs

International

References

External links

 

1993 births
Living people
Sportspeople from Skalica
Slovak ice hockey left wingers
HK 36 Skalica players
Lethbridge Hurricanes players
Windsor Spitfires players
HC Baník Sokolov players
HC '05 Banská Bystrica players
HK Dukla Trenčín players
HC Slovan Bratislava players
Stadion Hradec Králové players
HC Slavia Praha players
HC Dukla Jihlava players
HC Košice players
HK Dukla Michalovce players
HC Nové Zámky players
Slovak expatriate ice hockey players in Canada
Slovak expatriate ice hockey players in the Czech Republic
Slovak expatriate ice hockey players in Sweden